The 2001 French motorcycle Grand Prix was the fourth round of the 2001 Grand Prix motorcycle racing season. It took place on the weekend of 18–20 May 2001 at the Bugatti Circuit.

500 cc classification

250 cc classification

125 cc classification

Championship standings after the race (500cc)

Below are the standings for the top five riders and constructors after round four has concluded.

Riders' Championship standings

Constructors' Championship standings

 Note: Only the top five positions are included for both sets of standings.

References

French motorcycle Grand Prix
French
Motorcycle Grand Prix